Songs of Praise is the debut studio album by the British post-punk band Shame, released via Dead Oceans in January 2018.

Critical reception

Songs of Praise was met with widespread critical acclaim. At Metacritic, which assigns a normalised rating out of 100 to reviews from mainstream critics, the album received an average score of 83, based on 20 reviews.

Reviewing for The Times in January 2018, Will Hodgkinson said "this album has excitement and confidence fizzing out of every song, the spirit of punk-rock defiance given an energy shot for a new generation." Eve Barlow of Pitchfork proclaimed, "the UK rock group separates themselves from their peers, imbuing their post-adolescent rage with wit and, crucially, a self-effacing awareness that they may never succeed." In Mojo, Martin Aston called Songs of Praise an "incendiary debut" from a band who are "a visceral, frayed, clanging racket but still mindful of tunes".

Robert Christgau was lukewarm about the album and said, although Shame can "assemble a fast rock song—I see where the honorific 'punk' comes up in their reviews of praise, but this music just isn't intense enough to merit it—their affect is devoid of any species of uplift: humor, empathy, solidarity, lyrics with a twist, all that corny stuff I retain a yen for. Formally anthemic, spiritually not is another way to put it. True enough, this has turned into a white male mindset, affliction, what have you. Part of the problem not part of the solution. Might they lift themselves out of it sometime? Hope so."

Track listing

Personnel
Shame
 Charlie Steen – lead vocals
 Sean Coyle-Smith – guitar; backing vocals 
 Eddie Green – guitar; backing vocals 
 Josh Finerty – bass guitar; backing vocals ; additional percussion 
 Charlie Forbes – drums; backing vocals 

Additional Performers

 Holly Whitaker – backing vocals 
 Dan Foat – programming, keyboards
 Nathan Boddy – programming, keyboards

Production

 Dan Foat – production
 Nathan Boddy – production, mixing
 Sean Genockey – engineering
 Samir Alikhanizadeh – additional production 
 Joe Jones – assistant engineer
 Paul Carr – assistant engineer
 Ric Baxendale – additional engineering 
 Matt Colton – mastering

Artwork
 Holly Whitaker – photography 
 Miles Johnson – design

Charts

Accolades

References

2018 debut albums
Shame (band) albums
Dead Oceans albums